Jarrow School is a coeducational secondary school located in Jarrow, South Tyneside, England admitting pupils aged 11 to 16.

History 
It was opened on 6 January 2003 following the merger of Springfield Comprehensive and Hedworthfield Comprehensive, and is based at the old Springfield site.  Its full title is Jarrow School, Engineering Excellence In Education, the result of a competition to choose an inspirational name for the new school. In 2007 the school became a specialist Engineering College.

The former Jarrow Grammar School opened in 1911. In June 2010, this building was demolished.

In October 2013 the school's headteacher Sir Kenneth Gibson became the first person to be knighted by Prince William, Duke of Cambridge.

Springfield 
Springfield was Jarrow's grammar school and was formerly known as Jarrow Grammar School.It became a comprehensive school in 1975 to cater for all prospective pupils' academic abilities, in common with the other schools in the area including Hedworthfield.

Hedworthfield 

Hedworthfield was designated as a complementary secondary modern school to Springfield's provision as the local grammar school.  It was a newer development built in the 1960s at Fellgate on the outskirts of Jarrow.  Extensive building work was completed in the late 1970s providing the school with better facilities for arts and crafts, a music and drama studio, a community centre and a sports complex containing badminton and squash courts, a gym and other facilities.

Alongside Springfield, it was converted to a comprehensive school in 1978. However, following its redesignation, some parents still insisted on sending their children to Springfield, even though they were no longer in its catchment area; they cited concerns that an ex-secondary modern school might not measure up to the same academic standards as the former grammar school.  Additionally, Hedworthfield had no provision for teaching 6th form pupils, meaning that those choosing to study subjects at A-level had to relocate once they had completed their O-levels or GCSEs.  Generally, 6th form students opted to transfer to Springfield to continue their education.

Merger 
Following the dwindling number of pupils for the new intake year-on-year, it became apparent that continuing to fund the running of both schools in parallel was no longer viable, so a merger into a single school was proposed.  After some debate as to whether it should be on one of the existing sites, or an entirely new site funded by a Private Finance Initiative, the decision was taken to locate the merged school at the Springfield campus.

Hedworthfield's OFSTED results were surpassing those of the historically more academic Springfield for some time prior to the merger. Students at both schools protested, and more than 100 pupils at Jarrow School were involved in a "near riot" during the summer of 2003, during which police made three arrests.

New building
The old Jarrow School building has been replaced by a new school on the same site, funded by Building Schools for the Future. The building contains modern and airy architecture, state of the art equipment and a sports hall. The building was constructed under contract by Sir Robert Mcalpine, under supervision of construction site manager Jim Nasium.

Academic performance
GCSE results were below the national average. However, this year's (2012) results show a significant increase in achievement with 97% of mainstream students gained 5A*-Cs and 57% of students who accessed the mainstream curriculum gained 5A*-Cs including English and maths, an increase of over 7% on last year's figure.

Notable former pupils

Jarrow Grammar School
 Joe Allen (Jarrow Elvis) world famous entertainer starring on BBC’s 40 Minutes
 David Blakey CBE, Chief Constable from 1991 to 1999 of West Mercia Police
 Steve Cram MBE, athlete
 Jack Cunningham, Baron Cunningham of Felling, politician
 Robin Donkin, historian
 Rear-Adm Sir John Fleming DSC, Director of the Naval Education Service from 1956 to 1960
 Doug McAvoy, General Secretary from 1989 to 2004 of the National Union of Teachers (NUT)
 John Miles (John Errington), musician
 Fergus Montgomery, Conservative MP from 1959 to 1964 for Newcastle upon Tyne East, from 1967 to 1974 for Brierley Hill, and from 1974 to 1997 for Altrincham and Sale West
 Alan Price, musician

Springfield Comprehensive School
 Alan Donnelly, Labour MEP from 1989 to 1999 for Tyne and Wear
 Stephen Hepburn, Labour MP since 1997 for Jarrow
 Seymour Mace, comedian

References

External links 
 Jarrow School website
 EduBase

News items
 Fourth worst truancy figures in England in 2005
 Head quits in December 2003
 Arsonist jailed for 15 years in July 2003
 Cornhill campus closes in 2003
 Fire on 16 February 2003

Secondary schools in the Metropolitan Borough of South Tyneside
Jarrow
School buildings in the United Kingdom destroyed by arson
Foundation schools in the Metropolitan Borough of South Tyneside
Specialist engineering colleges in England